The United States Billiard Association or USBA is the governing body for all professional carom billiards tournaments in the United States, especially three-cushion billiards.

The United States Billiard Association (USBA) each year since 1968 the USBA and its predecessor organization the Billiard Federation of the USA has held a tournament to crown the National Champion. In 1989 the USBA was formed by the merger of BFUSA and American Billiard Association (ABA). Below is a list of champions by year including the location and the winner's tournament average.

USBA National Three-Cushion Championship

Top performers

External links

Cue sports governing bodies in the United States